Khelo India Winter Games are the national level multidisciplinary grassroot winter games of India. Events include Skiing, Alpine skiing, Nordic skiing, Snow rugby, Ice stock sport, Snow baseball, Mountaineering, Snowshoe running, Ice hockey, Figure skating and Speed skating. It was decided to hold the first Khelo India Winter Games in 2020 after the success of multiple editions of the Khelo India Youth Games.

Venues 
The first Khelo India Winter Games were held in two legs at two different venues:

 Khelo India Ladakh Winter Games – Leh
 Khelo India  Jammu and Kashmir Winter Games – Gulmarg

Sports and participation 
Events include snow shoe events (long distance snow shoe run, sprint 400m/ 800m), snow ski events, ski cycle downhill run, sledging downhill run, slalom (giant slalom, alpine ski slalom), Nordic (5 km/10 km/15 km), snow boarding slalom/ giant slalom, ski mountaineering (vertical race/sprint), Ice Stock Sport, snow rugby, ice hockey and snow baseball.

Events are categorised into age groups as well as according to block, district and union territory and state levels.

Sports 

 Alpine skiing
 Bandy
 Bobsleigh
 Curling
 Ice hockey
 Ice skating
 Ice stock sport

 Skeleton
 Skiing
 Ski mountaineering

 Snowboarding
 Snow baseball
 Snow rugby
 Speed skating
 Vertical race

Editions

Inaugurations and closing ceremony 
The first winter games were inaugurated by Minister of State for Youth Affairs and Sports Kiren Rijiju. The second winter games were inaugurated virtually by Prime Minister Narendra Modi. The closing ceremony witnesses festivities and cultural events.

Participation by Indian International athletes 

Aanchal Thakur participated in Skiing Events
Aadil Manzoor Peer participated in Ice stock sport Events.

See also 
 National Games of India
 Khelo India Youth Games
 Khelo India University Games

References

Further reading 
 Inauguration, Day 2, Day 3, Day 4, Conclusion. Greater Kashmir. 26 February, 28 February, 1–3 March 2021.

Sport in India
Khelo India
Winter sports competitions in India